Michael Benyaer is a Canadian-American actor. He is best known for his roles as Bob in the Canadian CGI series ReBoot and Hadji Singh in season one of The Real Adventures of Jonny Quest.

On playing Hadji, Benyaer stated, "[he] is one of the few roles for an ethnic actor that is not a bad guy. I mean, how many East Indian heroes have been on television? Hadji is for the sensitive kids out there. He is the outsider in all of us." A Star Wars fan, Benyaer relished the opportunity to work with Mark Hamill for the episode In the Realm of the Condor.

Benyaer has appeared in feature films, including Transformers: Revenge of the Fallen, G.I. Joe: The Rise of Cobra, The Hitman, Postal and Deadpool. On television, he has appeared in shows such as 24, NCIS, Castle, The Shield, Sanctuary, The Last Ship, The Flash, Modern Family, Emily's Reasons Why Not and Days of Our Lives.

His notable animation roles include Ken in Barbie and the Rockers: Out of This World, G.I. Joe as Airwave and Scoop, Exosquad as Kaz Takagi and Praetorious, Hurricanes as Stats Hiro and Plato Quinones, Hot Wheels: World Race as William "Banjee" Castillo and Kanan Jarrus in Lego Star Wars: Droid Tales. He guest-starred as various characters on Robot Chicken.

His voice is heard in the video games Assassin's Creed: Revelations as Darim Ibn La-Ahad, Lt. Draza in Uncharted 2: Among Thieves, Lt. Nanib Sahir in Age of Empires III: The Asian Dynasties, Vampire: The Masquerade – Redemption as Wilhelm, Marvel Heroes as Dum Dum Dugan, King's Quest as Mr. Waddles and Dying Light as Tahir. He also provides various voices in The Matrix: Path of Neo, Star Wars: The Old Republic, 007: Quantum of Solace, SOCOM 4 U.S. Navy SEALs, Need for Speed: Underground, The Elder Scrolls, Skylanders: Trap Team and Call of Duty: Advanced Warfare.

Benyaer has also worked as a scriptwriter for several episodes of Billy the Cat, the cult TV series Pilot One and the Canadian version of Sesame Street.

Filmography

Film

Television

Video games

References

External links
 

Living people
Canadian male television writers
Canadian male video game actors
Canadian male voice actors
Canadian television writers
Year of birth missing (living people)